Fareed Zargar is an Afghan cricketer. He made his first-class debut for Mis Ainak Region in the 2018 Ahmad Shah Abdali 4-day Tournament on 13 March 2018. He made his List A debut for Mis Ainak Region in the 2018 Ghazi Amanullah Khan Regional One Day Tournament on 23 July 2018.

References

External links
 

Year of birth missing (living people)
Living people
Afghan cricketers
Mis Ainak Knights cricketers
Place of birth missing (living people)